The Kennedy/Marshall Company (K/M) is an American film-production company, based in Santa Monica, California, founded in 1992 by spouses Kathleen Kennedy and Frank Marshall.

It presently has contracts with Paramount Pictures, Spyglass Entertainment, DreamWorks Pictures, Universal Pictures, 20th Century Studios, Warner Bros. Pictures and the Walt Disney Studios. Kennedy and Marshall are formerly founders at Steven Spielberg's Amblin Entertainment studio.

History 
In 1992, Kathleen Kennedy and Frank Marshall left Amblin Entertainment to form their own self-titled banner The Kennedy/Marshall Company with a 3-year first look deal at Paramount Pictures. After leaving Amblin, Marshall directed and Kennedy produced Alive which was released in 1993 as a Kennedy/Marshall production; however, the first film under their deal with Paramount was Milk Money (1994).

In 1995, the duo left Paramount Pictures with a three-year production deal at the Walt Disney Studios. In 1998, the company tried their first foray into television, signing a development pact with CBS to air Kennedy/Marshall's television shows for the network. Later that same year, the studio left Disney for Universal Pictures, with an eleven-year deal.

In 2005, Kennedy/Marshall entered its foray onto the Broadway fold to bring the Off Broadway revival Hurlyburly to Broadway.

In 2009, they left Universal Pictures for Sony Pictures Entertainment. Two years later, they left Sony Pictures for DreamWorks Pictures.

In 2012, Kennedy left to join Lucasfilm as president. During the same year, the studio signed a deal with CBS Television Studios to produce TV shows made for the company.

Selected filmography

Feature films

1990s

2000s

2010s

2020s

Upcoming

Television shows

References

External links
 

 
Film production companies of the United States
Companies based in Santa Monica, California
American companies established in 1992
1992 establishments in California
Privately held companies based in California